Mucilaginibacter lutimaris is a Gram-negative, facultatively aerobic, non-spore-forming, rod-shaped and non-motile bacterium from the genus of Mucilaginibacter which has been isolated from tidal flat sediments from the western coast of Korea.

References

External links
Type strain of Mucilaginibacter lutimaris at BacDive -  the Bacterial Diversity Metadatabase

Sphingobacteriia
Bacteria described in 2012